Nogometni klub Naklo, commonly referred to as NK Naklo or simply Naklo, is a Slovenian football club from Naklo. NK Naklo played a total of four seasons in the Slovenian PrvaLiga, the country's highest division, in the 1990s. The club folded in 2010 after failing to obtain competition licences issued by the Football Association of Slovenia, and was refounded in the same year.

Name changes 

Club names through history:

 Športni klub Slovan (1936–1946)
 Fizkulturno društvo Naklo (1946–1952)
 TVD Partizan Naklo (1952–1990)
 NK Živila Naklo (1990–1995)
 NK Naklo (1995–present)

Honours
Upper Carniolan League (fourth tier)
 Winners: 2009–10

References

External links
Official website 

Association football clubs established in 1936
Association football clubs established in 2010
Football clubs in Slovenia
Football clubs in Yugoslavia
1936 establishments in Slovenia
2010 establishments in Slovenia